The Senegal national under-18 and under-19 basketball team is a national basketball team of Senegal, administered by the Fédération Sénégalaise de Basket-Ball.
It represents the country in international under-18 and under-19 (under age 18 and under age 19) basketball competitions.

See also
Senegal national basketball team
Senegal national under-17 basketball team
Senegal women's national under-19 basketball team

References

External links
Archived records of Senegal team participations

Basketball teams in Senegal
Men's national under-19 basketball teams
Basketball